Rosalinda is a 1945 Mexican  historical drama film directed by Rolando Aguilar and starring María Antonieta Pons, Rafael Baledón and Tito Junco.

Cast
 María Antonieta Pons as Rosalinda  
 Rafael Baledón as Armando  
 Tito Junco as Gumaro  
 Agustín Isunza as Simón  
 Meche Barba as Luisa  
 Miguel Ángel Ferriz as Don Chon  
 Luis G. Barreiro as Guardafaro  
 Guillermo Calles as Juan 
 Alfonso Bedoya as Cecina  
 Jorge Arriaga 
 Gilberto González 
 Max Langler
 Stephen Berne as Hombre en cantina 
 José Chávez as Pueblerino 
 Roberto Corell as El Peruano  
 Chel López as Capitán  
 José Pardavé 
 José Ignacio Rocha as Pueblerino

References

Bibliography 
 Rogelio Agrasánchez. Guillermo Calles: A Biography of the Actor and Mexican Cinema Pioneer. McFarland, 2010.

External links 
 

1945 films
1940s historical drama films
Mexican historical drama films
1940s Spanish-language films
Films directed by Rolando Aguilar
Films set in the 19th century
Mexican black-and-white films
1945 drama films
1940s Mexican films